Uptown Rulers: The Meters live on the Queen Mary is a live album by the funk group The Meters recorded on March 24, 1975. It was recorded at the Venus and Mars album release party hosted by Linda and Paul McCartney on board the Queen Mary ship. It captures the band's live sound at their peak in the mid 1970s. It is the only live recording of the band from that period.

Track listing

Personnel
Credits adapted from AllMusic, with cover songwriter credits.
The Meters
Arthur Neville – keyboards, vocals
Leo Nocentelli – guitar, vocals
Ziggy Modeliste – drums, vocals
Cyril Neville – percussion, vocals
George Porter Jr. – bass, vocals
Production
Allen Toussaint – producer
Marshall Sehorn – producer

Further reading

References

The Meters albums
Albums produced by Allen Toussaint
1992 live albums
Rhino Records live albums